John Curry (1949–1994) was a British figure skater.

John Curry is may also refer to:

John Curry (historian) (died 1780), Irish physician
John Curry (ice hockey) (born 1984), American ice hockey goaltender
John A. Curry (born 1934), president of Northeastern University, Boston, 1989–1996
John F. Curry (1886–1973), U.S. Army Air Corps major-general, first national commander of the Civil Air Patrol
John Steuart Curry (1897–1946), American painter
John W. Curry (died 1899), first African-American letter carrier in the United States Post Office

Jack Curry (born 1964), American sportswriter

See also
John Currie (disambiguation)
John Currey (1814–1912), judge